Merriwa may refer to several places:

 Merriwa, New South Wales
 Merriwa Shire, former municipality in New South Wales
 Merriwa, Western Australia

See also
 Merriwa (wasp), a genus of wasps in the family Platygastridae
 Merriwa River, river in New South Wales